Soltanabad-e Chetaq (also Romanized as Solţānābād-e Chetāq and Solţānābād-e Cheţāq; also known as Solţānābād) is a village in Taghamin Rural District, Korani District, Bijar County, Kurdistan Province, Iran. At the 2006 census, its population was 118, with 23 families. The village is populated by Azerbaijanis.

References 

Towns and villages in Bijar County
Azerbaijani settlements in Kurdistan Province